The Taiyuan Metro is a rapid transit system in Taiyuan, capital of China's Shanxi province. The system opened on December 26, 2020.

Line 1 has been under construction since 30 December 2019 and is scheduled to open in 2024.

History
The Taiyuan Metro project was officially launched in September 2009, with the establishment of the Taiyuan Metro Preparation Office. The office prepared the construction proposal and network plan, which after being approved by the Taiyuan city government were sent to the central government for approval. The National Development and Reform Commission approved the first phase of the proposal (2012−18) on 5 September 2012, and construction of Line 2 began on 2 November 2013.

Lines in Operation

Line 2

Line 2 was the first line to be built and opened on December 26, 2020. It crosses the main urban area of Taiyuan in a north-south direction. Construction began on 2 November 2013. The line uses 24 six-car Type A automated trains.

Under Construction

Line 1
Line 1 is the next line scheduled for construction. The planned route runs between Xishan Mining Bureau Station to Wusu Airport Station, and passes high traffic areas such as Taiyuan West Bus Station, Taiyuan University of Technology, Great South Gate, Wuyi Square, and Taiyuan Railway Station. Construction started on December 30, 2019. It is projected to be completed in 2024.

Future Development

The entire network is scheduled to be built in three phases lasting 17 years. The first phase, consisting of Line 1 and Line 2, with a combined  of track, is to be built from 2013 to 2020. This phase is projected to cost 30.9 billion yuan to build, or 628 million yuan per kilometre. The rest of the network is planned to be built between 2020 and 2030, completing the  network.

Network Map

References

Taiyuan
Rapid transit in China
Rail transport in Shanxi
Transport infrastructure under construction in China